Pron or variation, may refer to:

Generally
 pronunciation (pron.)
 pr0n in leetspeek
 pornography

People
 Cristina Giai Pron (born 1974), Italian canoeist
 Maria Clara Giai Pron (born 1992), Italian canoeist
 Patricio Pron (born 1975), Argentinian writer
 Viktoria Pron (born 1965), Ukrainian badminton player

 Louis DaPron (1913–1987), U.S. dancer and choreographer
 Timothy DuPron Hauser (1941–2014), U.S. singer

Other uses
 Patriotic Movement for National Rebirth
 pronoun

See also

 
 Porn (disambiguation)
 Prong (disambiguation)